Marja Kallasmaa (born 21 August 1950 in Kehra) is an Estonian linguist.

In 1975 she graduated from Tartu State University with a degree in Estonian philology. Since 1978, she has worked at the Estonian Language Institute.

Her main field of research has been onomastics. She is the leading onomastic in Estonia. In 1998 she laid the foundation to the database of Estonian toponyms.

She is a member of Mother Tongue Society.

Awards
 2017: Wiedemann Language Award

Works

 Структура эстонской микротопонимии (на материале западного диалекта) (1981, manuscript)
 Saaremaa kohanimed I, II (1996, 2000)
 Läänemurde loodus- ja viljelusnimed (2003)
 Hiiumaa kohanimed (2010)

References

1950 births
Living people
Linguists from Estonia
Women linguists
University of Tartu alumni
People from Kehra